Dry Bridge Elementary School, also known as East Martinsville Grammar School, is a historic Rosenwald school located at Martinsville, Virginia. It was built between 1928 and 1930, and is a one-story, rectangular brick building with a concrete foundation, brick walls and deck-on-hip roof.  The building housed four classrooms.  Annexation brought Dry Bridge School into the Martinsville School District in 1948, and a freestanding school addition was built beside Dry Bridge School in 1958. The two buildings were called the East Martinsville Grammar School.  The school closed at the end of the 1967–1968 school year as the result of school desegregation in Martinsville. In 1969, MARC Workshop, Inc. began occupying the building.

It was listed on the National Register of Historic Places in 2008.

References

African-American history of Virginia
Rosenwald schools in Virginia
School buildings on the National Register of Historic Places in Virginia
School buildings completed in 1930
Neoclassical architecture in Virginia
Schools in Martinsville, Virginia
National Register of Historic Places in Martinsville, Virginia
1930 establishments in Virginia